The 1973 UK & Ireland Greyhound Racing Year was the 47th year of greyhound racing in the United Kingdom and Ireland.

Roll of honour

Summary
The annual National Greyhound Racing Club (NGRC) returns were released, with totalisator turnover at £58,495,322 and attendances recorded at 6,101,704 from 5458 meetings.

The 1972 Greyhound of the Year, Patricias Hope sealed a second English Greyhound Derby triumph. He became only the second greyhound in history, after Mick the Miller to claim a second title. The event was broadcast live on ITV's World of Sport and he won £12,500, under new sponsors Spillers. John O'Connor had bought a share in the greyhound and trained him for the 1973 competition. He was later retired and returned to stud duties.

Tracks
Two more Greyhound Racing Association stadia closed under their Property Trust, White City Stadium (Liverpool) which had only been purchased by them in 1972, closed on 6 October 1973 and Reading closed on 10 November. Portsmouth gained a reprieve because the GRA property bubble burst and greyhound racing became the only viable option again. The property boom would soon turn into a slump.

Bobby Jack Enterprises purchased independent track Mount Vernon Sports Stadium, in Glasgow and invested heavily to update the facility.

News
The Wembley kennels were demolished leaving some of the sport's most famous trainers without a base. Jack Harvey, Bob Burls and Jack Kinsley were all forced into early retirement. Jimmy Jowett and Sid Mann, two other major training names also retired. Jowett was probably unsettled by the threat of closure hanging over Clapton and Mann, GRA's longest serving trainer had earned a full trainers licence back in 1930 at Hall Green. Gloucester stadium trainer Leslie Carpenter died aged 79, he had trained for over 40 years.

Jack Tetlow, the Wembley Racing Manager also retired after 40 year's service and Leicester Racing Manager George McKay died after a life in greyhound racing. Bob Rowe became the White City Racing Manager taking over from Charlie Birch.

Trainers Stan Gudgin and Ron Jeffrey moved to Slough and Portsmouth respectively following the closure of Reading. The NGRC announced plans to revamp licences, the current licences were private racecourse or dispersed full licence, owner trainer licence and C-licence, this was done in the hope that many of the 62 independent tracks would join the NGRC banner and 46 NGRC tracks at the time.

The last McWhirter drag hare in use (at Oxford) was switched to an Outside Sumner, and a new world and national record for 525 yards was set at Brighton by Easy Investment who recorded 28.17. The end of year annual Duke of Edinburgh Cup was won by Wembley after a final victory of 64 to 56 over Hall Green and White City was used for a film called Steptoe and Son Ride Again.

Ireland
The government legalised tote betting in Northern Ireland, a decision that came 45 years too late for Celtic Park (Belfast) who had started racing in 1927. The Irish Greyhound Derby sponsors PJ Carroll Ltd offered a single race prize of £1,200 for Dundalk International and doubled the Derby winner's prize to £10,000, which was won by Bashful Man.

Larry Kelly's Romping To Work was voted Irish Greyhound of the Year after winning both the Oaks and St Leger.

Competitions
Patricias Hope stole all of the headlines but St Leger champion Ramdeen Stuart started his 1973 campaign by winning the Gold Collar at Catford Stadium. Case Money, a black dog trained by Ted Parker was voted Greyhound of the Year, he had won the 1973 St Leger and the Ben Truman Stakes, in addition to the Shelbourne 600 before arriving in the UK. This was a slightly strange decision based on the fact that Patricias Hope had emulated the achievement of Mick the Miller.

Principal UK races

Principal Irish finals

Totalisator returns

The totalisator returns declared to the licensing authorities for the year 1973 are listed below.

References 

Greyhound racing in the United Kingdom
Greyhound racing in the Republic of Ireland
UK and Ireland Greyhound Racing Year
UK and Ireland Greyhound Racing Year
UK and Ireland Greyhound Racing Year
UK and Ireland Greyhound Racing Year